Nathalie "Natacha" Régnier (born 11 April 1974) is a Belgian actress. She received a Cannes Film Festival Award, a European Film Award, and a César Award for her role in the 1998 film The Dreamlife of Angels. Régnier is the first Belgian actress to win a César Award.

Life and career
Born in Ixelles, a municipality of Brussels, she was attracted to theatre from early adolescence. Her first screen role was in The Motorcycle Girl (1993), a short film by Stéphan Carpiaux. After that, she played a number of roles for French television.

In 1998 Régnier and Élodie Bouchez received the Prix d'interprétation féminine (Best Actress) at the 1998 Cannes Film Festival for their roles in La vie rêvée des anges by Erick Zonca.

She has stated that her idol is film actress Sandrine Bonnaire.

Régnier dated Jérémie Renier. Natacha Régnier was married to French musician Yann Tiersen, but they are now divorced. They have a daughter.

She received a Magritte Award nomination for Best Supporting Actress. Régnier has just finished the film Une journée, which is now in post-production.

Selected filmography
Encore (1996), directed by Pascal Bonitzer
La vie rêvée des anges (The Dreamlife of Angels) (1998), directed by Erick Zonca – Marie Thomas
Les amants criminels (1999), directed by François Ozon – Alice
Il tempo dell'amore (1999), directed by Giacomo Campiotti – Claire
Tout va bien, on s'en va (2000), directed by Claude Mouriéras – Claire
How I Killed My Father (2001), directed by Anne Fontaine – Isa
Vert paradis (2003), directed by Emmanuel Bourdieu – Isabelle
Le Pont des Arts (2004) by Eugène Green
Tomorrow We Move (2004), directed by Chantal Akerman – La femme enceinte
The Right of the Weakest (2006)
Poison Friends (2006) 
Boxes (2007), directed by Jane Birkin – Fanny
La Proie (2011) – Christine Maurel
One Night (2012) by Lucas Belvaux – Anne
Capital (2013), directed by Costa Gavras – Diane Tourneuil
Mood Indigo (2013)
The Son of Joseph (2016) by Eugène Green – Marie
Above the Law (2017)
The Benefit of the Doubt (2017)
Marseille (2018) – TV series
The Promise (2020) – TV series

Theatre
 2009 : C'était Marie-Antoinette by Évelyne Lever, Opéra National de Montpellier, Festival de Radio France et Montpellier – Marie-Antoinette

References

External links

 
 
 
 Natacha Régnier online 

1974 births
Living people
People from Ixelles
European Film Award for Best Actress winners
Belgian film actresses
Belgian television actresses
20th-century Belgian actresses
21st-century Belgian actresses
Cannes Film Festival Award for Best Actress winners
Most Promising Actress César Award winners